Divine Darkness is the third studio album of the Slovak band Lavagance. The album was recorded at Lavagance studio and released under the Lavagance label on 1 April 2009.

Track list
 "It Happened That Night"
 "Blood from God's Side"
 "I See You in My Dreams"
 "Divine Sobriety"
 "Young, Talented and Gone"
 "That Face is Me"
 "Redemption"
 "Days of our Lives"
 "Leaving"
 "Wings Spreadin' Wide"
 "Hellbent"
 "Time to be Hurt"
 (Bonus Track)

Personnel
 Marek Rakovický - vocals, guitar, programming, keyboards
 Vincent Susol - bass guitar, vocals
 Viliam Bujnovský - keyboards, programming
 Marek Gregor - drums, vocals, programming
 Mario Smashing - guitar, vocals, keyboards
 Peter Rakovický - keyboards, programming & sound engineering

References

External links
 Official Lavagance website: lavagance.com
 Lavagance on MySpace

Lavagance albums
2009 albums